The Gentleman from Indiana is a surviving 1915 American silent drama film directed by Frank Lloyd and written by Julia Crawford Ivers and Frank Lloyd after the novel by Booth Tarkington. The film stars Dustin Farnum, Winifred Kingston, Herbert Standing, Page Peters, Howard Davies, and Juan de la Cruz. The film was released on November 28, 1915, by Paramount Pictures.

Plot
The film was advertised as a "a powerful drama of politics and romance".

Cast 
Dustin Farnum as John Harkless
Winifred Kingston as Helen Sherwood
Herbert Standing as Joe Fisbee
Page Peters as Lige Willets
Howard Davies as Rodney McCune
Juan de la Cruz as Tom Meredith
Joe Ray as Skillett
Elsie Cort as Skillett's Girl
C. Norman Hammond as Judge Briscoe
Helen Jerome Eddy

Preservation status
A print of The Gentleman from Indiana is preserved in the Library of Congress collection, Packard Campus for Audio-Visual Conservation.

References

External links 

 

1915 films
1910s English-language films
Silent American drama films
1915 drama films
Paramount Pictures films
Films based on works by Booth Tarkington
Films directed by Frank Lloyd
American black-and-white films
American silent feature films
Surviving American silent films
1910s American films